An Evening with Raoul was a weekly musical variety talk show hosted by Raoul Imbach, with the band The Wild Tortillas. Imbach is a counselor and deputy chief of mission of the Embassy of Switzerland in the Philippines from August 2013 to December 2021, and a singer more popularly known by his renditions of Filipino and Italian songs.

The program was produced by Asian Television Content Corporation (ATC) and aired over IBC-13 every Saturday at 10:00 p.m. to 11:00 p.m. (UTC +08) for one season, starting July 1, 2017. The program has featured different segments including cooking, interviews and performances, among others.

See also
List of programs broadcast by Intercontinental Broadcasting Corporation

References

Philippine variety television shows
Intercontinental Broadcasting Corporation original programming
2017 Philippine television series debuts
English-language television shows